The 2015 City of Onkaparinga ATP Challenger was a professional tennis tournament played on hard courts. It was the first edition of the tournament which was part of the 2015 ATP Challenger Tour. It took place in Happy Valley, Australia between 3–11 January 2015.

ATP entrants

Seeds

 Rankings are as of December 15, 2014.

Other entrants
The following players received wildcards into the singles main draw:
  John-Patrick Smith
  Omar Jasika
  Alex Bolt
  Jordan Thompson

The following players received entry from the qualifying draw:
  Andrew Whittington
  Maxime Authom
  Andrew Harris
  Jacob Grills

The following players received entry as a lucky loser:
  Aldin Šetkić

Champions

Singles

  Ryan Harrison def.  Marcos Baghdatis, 7–6(10–8), 6–4

Doubles

  Andrey Kuznetsov /  Aleksandr Nedovyesov def.  Alex Bolt /  Andrew Whittington, 7–5, 6–4

External links
Official Website
ITF Search
ATP official site

City of Onkaparinga ATP Challenger
City of Onkaparinga ATP Challenger
2015 in Australian tennis